The  is an annual award given by Shueisha's Super Dash Bunko imprint for the best new light novel of the year. The award was first presented in 2001. Submissions are accepted until October 25 each year, and announced on April 25 of the following year.

Company Info

 is a Shueisha publishing imprint established in July 2000 for publishing light novels aimed at teenage boys. In April 2001, the label inherited a strong lineup from the discontinued Super Fantasy Bunko label, in addition to inheriting all of their school life and slapstick light novel series. The label also administers the Super Dash Novel Rookie of the Year Award, given out since 2001. Original novel series released under the label include Read or Die by Hideyuki Kurata, Happy Seven by Hiroyuki Kawasaki, Ginban Kaleidoscope by Rei Kaibara, Kure-nai by Kentarō Katayama, and Akikan! by Riku Ranjō.

Selection committee
The selection committee for the first five years consisted of science fiction and fantasy author Motoko Arai, anime director, screenwriter, and producer Ryōsuke Takahashi, video game designer Yūji Horii, and Akutagawa Prize-winning author Kazushige Abe. In 2006, Abe was replaced on the panel by novelist Kō Nakamura.

Recipients

External links
 Super Dash Novel Rookie of the Year Award (official site)
 Super Dash Bunko (Company website)

References

Awards established in 2001
First book awards
Light novel awards

2001 establishments in Japan
Japanese literary awards
Japanese-language literary awards